Laia (pronounced Lah-yah) is a shortened version of the Catalan feminine given name Eulàlia. Saint Eulalia is the patron saint of Barcelona, so her name and its derivatives (the most popular being Laia) are popular in Spain. Laia means "fair of speech" or "well spoken" in Greek. 

It may refer to:
 Laia Abril (born 1986), Catalan artist
 Laia Aleixandri (born 2000), Spanish footballer
 Laia Cañigueral (born 1981), Spanish sociologist and politician
 Laia Codina (born 2000), Spanish footballer
 Laia Costa (born 1985), Spanish actress
 Laia Forcadell (born 1982), Spanish sprinter and hurdler
 Laia Tutzó (born 1980), Spanish former sailor
 Laia Martínez i López (born 1984), Catalan writer and musician
 Laia Marull (born 1973), Spanish actress
 Laia Palau (born 1979), Spanish basketball player
 Laia Pons (born 1993), Spanish synchronized swimmer
 Laia Sanz (born 1985), Spanish motorcycle racer

Catalan feminine given names
Spanish feminine given names